Vera Schalburg (23 November 1914 in Siberia – 8 February 1946 in Hamburg) was a Soviet, German and British agent and sister of Christian Frederik von Schalburg.

Biography

Vera von Schalburg was born in Siberia, Russia as the second of three children to August Theodor von Schalburg and wife, Helene. Her father was born 1879 in Nyborg and her mother was born 1882 in Ukraine (possibly Poltava). She lived in Russia until the October Revolution of 1917 when she fled with her family to Denmark.
	
In 1920, she moved with her family from Hellerup to Vibevej 14, Copenhagen, and in 1922 the family moved to Borups Allé 4, where in 1925 she still lived with her parents and youngest brother August. In Denmark she was known to the authorities as Vera Schalburg.

Later, Schalburg lived in Paris, where she made a living as a dancer. There she was recruited by the Abwehr and sent to England in 1938. Her older brother C. F. Von Schalburg was not pleased and believed that it would hurt his reputation and that of his party, the DNSAP, if it became known that she had been both in German and Soviet service. In May 1939 he therefore brought up the issue with Renthe-Fink, a German diplomat in Denmark, who arranged for Vera's recall from London. 

She continued as an agent for the  Abwehr in Copenhagen until the night of 30 September 1940, where she was sent from Stavanger by seaplane and rubber raft to the Scottish coast near Buckie. She and two other agents, Karl Theodor Drücke and Werner Waelti, landed on the northeast coast of Scotland (Operation Lena). Under her code-name Vera Erikson, she soon caught the attention of the Scottish police. She and her two companions were arrested at Portgordon as they tried to buy a train ticket to London. She   was supposed to return to London as hostess for a fashionable tea salon in Mayfair, attended by key politicians. However, the three agents were quickly arrested and Drücke and Waelti were convicted of espionage and hanged in the Wandsworth prison. 

Vera Schalburg survived by becoming an agent for the British. She was first taught by Klop Ustinov of MI5 and then sent to Isle of Wight to spy on prisoners taken by Britain, while herself pretending to be a prisoner.

Death

Returning to Germany after the war, Schalburg died, under the name of Vera von Wedel, from pneumonia on 8 February 1946 at the  Marienkrankenhaus hospital in Hamburg, aged 31. She was buried in the Ohlsdorf Cemetery. The grave, paid for by Ernst Bodo von Zitzewitz, a former Hamburg Abwher officer.

Portrayal in the media
In the 2013 German TV production The Beautiful Spy, Vera von [sic] Schalburg is portrayed by Valerie Niehaus.

Sources and references
 Main source: 
 “The Beautiful Spy”, David Tremain, The History Press, 2019

1914 births
1946 deaths
Danish people of Russian descent
Soviet spies
World War II spies for Germany
World War II spies for the United Kingdom
White Russian emigrants to Denmark
Emigrants from the Russian Empire to Denmark
Deaths from pneumonia in Germany